Dario di Fazio (born 19 December 1966) is a Venezuelan diver. He competed at the 1992 Summer Olympics and the 1996 Summer Olympics.

References

1966 births
Living people
Venezuelan male divers
Olympic divers of Venezuela
Divers at the 1992 Summer Olympics
Divers at the 1996 Summer Olympics
Place of birth missing (living people)
20th-century Venezuelan people